SEA Today (abbreviation from Southeast Asia Today) is an Indonesian English-language news and lifestyle television channel targeting Southeast Asian and international audiences. Owned by PT Metra Digital Media (MD Media), a subsidiary of the state-owned telecommunication company Telkom Indonesia, the channel was launched on October 28, 2020 in conjunction with Youth Pledge Day.

SEA Today currently airs through IndiHome IPTV service UseeTV and MNC Vision's DTH Service in Indonesia since September 2022 and StarHub TV Singapore's IPTV Services.

History
A UseeTV (now IndiHome TV) exclusive in-house channel,  was intended as "a place for state-owned enterprises, governments (both central and local) and private businesses as well as small enterprises to deliver positive messages about inspiring Indonesian works through exciting, entertaining, and educating television programs".

On October 28, 2020,  was replaced by SEA Today at 7:20 PM WIB after the 100% Indonesia music show. In their launching, SEA Today was inaugurated by the Minister of State Owned Enterprises at the time, Erick Thohir.

Programs
 SEA Update
 SEA Morning Show
 3-Hour News Show
 Duo Ransel
 Maestro
 Cerita Di Balik Lensa
 Temurun
 Break The Limit
 Local Pride
 Seafood
 Kapsul Ramadan
 Ramadan Log
 Buddy Talk
 See Indonesia
 The Daily Wrap-Up
 Ngoceh
 Nomadic Trip
 Ruang Teh
 Stories of Taste
 Abandoned Places
 The Myth of Indonesia
 Mosques Around The World
 Islam Is Good Morality
 Richness of Creations
 Meet The Creators
 Magnificent Megacities
 Ngonten
 The Land of Spices
 Duo Backpackers
 Waterfall
 Masa Kini
 The Animal Library
 Land of Santri
 Tabula Rasa
 Find The Answer with Buya Yahya
 Art of Indonesia
 Why We Ride
 Stories of Taste
 SEAmphony
 Journals of a Nomad
 This Weekend
 The Animal Library
 Field Guide to Innovation
 The Travel Note
 Serial Tourist
 Dreamcatchers
 Superheroes, The Secret Side
 The Wish
 Eat Around Indonesia
 Miss Adventure
 Babouchka
 Challenge Accepted
 Side Walk
 The Wisdom
 Australia's Most Terryfing
 Roots of Egypt
 Stories From Hidden Words
 Classic Cars
 The Ultimate Riders
 Cantik Detektif
 Vet on The Hill
 Refugee Chef
 Space Out
 Angelo's Outdoor Kitchen
 Around The World in 80 Days
 Ramadan in The Islamic World
 Grand Central Station
 Mission Restorable
 House of Islam
 The Majestic Alps

Clossing 
Hymne Guru sung by Echa, Nicky and Surya Children Choir

Presenter
 Amano Pikamee (Ms. Kettle)
 Amelia Watson
 Aubry Beer
 Aris Satya
 Bruce Poan
 Boan Sianipar
 Caroline Soerachmat
 Ceres Fauna
 Dirza Prakoso
 Gawr Gura (Ms. Shark)
 Hans Lango
 Haneuzu Miuneru
 Hilyani Hidranto
 Iyas Lawrence
 Kai Soerja
 Karina Basrewan
 Krizia Alexa
 Maria Christy
 Maria Harfanti
 Marissa Anita
 Mochamad Achir
 Paul Palele
 Rahma Alia
 Rahma Landy
 Rasya Maeve
 Rory Asyari
 Shafira Umm
 Shahnaz Soehartono

 Wibisono Notodirdjo
 Yasha Chatab

References

External links
Official website

Television channels and stations established in 2020
2020 establishments in Indonesia
Telkom Indonesia
Television stations in Indonesia
24-hour television news channels in Indonesia
English-language television stations